Altica bicarinata is a species of leaf beetle from the subfamily Galerucinae. It can be found in Greece, Israel, Lebanon, Syria, Iraq, on Cyprus, in the north of Egypt and Saudi Arabia.

References

Beetles described in 1860
Beetles of Asia
Alticini